The Rothmans International Tennis Tournament was a men's tennis tournament held in London, England between 1970 and 1977. The tournament was played on indoor carpet courts at Royal Albert Hall in London, except for the final edition in 1977 which was played at Earls Court Exhibition Centre, and was held in the March. From 1973 until 1977 the tournament was organized as part of the World Championship Tennis circuit.

Past finals

Singles

Doubles

Notes

References

 
International sports competitions in London
Indoor tennis tournaments
Carpet court tennis tournaments
Recurring sporting events established in 1970
Defunct tennis tournaments in the United Kingdom